|}

The Irish Gold Cup (Irish: Corn Óir na hÉireann) is a Grade 1 National Hunt steeplechase in Ireland which is open to horses aged five years or older. It is run at Leopardstown over a distance of about 3 miles (4,828 metres), and during its running there are seventeen fences to be jumped. The race is scheduled to take place each year in February.

The event was first run in 1987, and it was originally titled the Vincent O'Brien Irish Gold Cup. It was named after Vincent O'Brien (1917–2009), who was a successful racehorse trainer. The race was renamed the Hennessy Gold Cup in 1991, when Hennessy began sponsoring and it was often referred to as the "Irish Hennessy", as there was also a long-established chase in Great Britain called the Hennessy Gold Cup. Hennessy's sponsorship ended after the 2015 running and the 2016 event was run as the unsponsored Irish Gold Cup. Unibet sponsored the Irish Gold Cup from 2017 to 2019.  In 2017, it was run as the Stan James Irish Gold Cup Chase and in 2018 and 2019 as the Unibet Irish Gold Cup. Since 2020 the race has been sponsored by Paddy Power.

Throughout its history the race has served as a leading trial for the Cheltenham Gold Cup. Four horses have won both events in the same year – Jodami (1993), Imperial Call (1996), Sizing John (2017) and Galopin Des Champs (2023).

Records
Most successful horse (4 wins):
 Florida Pearl – 1999, 2000, 2001, 2004

Leading jockey (4 wins):
 Mark Dwyer –  Forgive 'n Forget (1987), Jodami (1993,1994,1995)

Leading trainer (12 wins):
 Willie Mullins - Florida Pearl (1999,2000,2001,2004), Alexander Banquet (2002), Rule Supreme (2005), Kempes (2011), Quel Esprit (2012), Sir Des Champs (2013), Bellshill (2019), Kemboy (2021), Galopin Des Champs (2023)

Winners
 Amateur jockeys indicated by "Mr".

See also
 List of Irish National Hunt races
 Recurring sporting events established in 1987  – this race is included under its original title, Vincent O'Brien Irish Gold Cup.

References

 Racing Post:

 pedigreequery.com – Hennessy Cognac Gold Cup – Leopardstown.

National Hunt races in Ireland
National Hunt chases
Leopardstown Racecourse
Recurring sporting events established in 1987